Division 19 is a 2017 British-American dystopian political thriller film directed and written by S. A. Halewood. The film stars Linus Roache, Clarke Peters, Alison Doody and Jamie Draven.

Cast
Jamie Draven as Hardin Jones
Linus Roache as Charles Lyndon
Alison Doody as Neilsen
Clarke Peters as Perelman
Lotte Verbeek as Aisha
Will Rothhaar as Nash
L. Scott Caldwell as Michelle Jacobs
Toby Hemingway as Barca
Ashton Moio as Dale Peretti
Anthony Okungbowa as Martins
Tim Jo as Alden
Jennifer Soo as George

Plot
Division 19 looks at the loss of personal anonymity in 2039. The new TV show uses real record of personalities. Hackers anonymous organization has help prisoner, who filmed by hidden cameras for the TV real series, to escape from being tracked by the hidden recording.

Filming
The filming of the Division 19 began on July 30, 2013 in Detroit, Michigan and continued in Los Angeles and London. Editing took place in London 2017 and the film will be released 2018.

Executive Producers: Adam Draper, Diane Kasperowicz, David Mutch, Kathryn Sheard and Melissa Simmonds.

Awards
WINNER Critics' Award, Fantasporto Film Festival

WINNER Best Director Suzie Halewood, Boston Science Fiction Film Festival 2018.

References

External links

Unreleased films
English-language films
Films shot in Michigan
American dystopian films
American political thriller films
2010s political thriller films
Films about security and surveillance